Naidra Ayadi is a French actress. She won the César Award for Most Promising Actress in 2012 for her role in the film Polisse.

Life and career
Naidra Ayadi was born to a Tunisian family in Saint-Ouen, Seine-Saint-Denis, in the northern suburbs of Paris. She spent several years working mainly in theatre acting and television before her breakthrough film role in 2011's Polisse, directed by Maïwenn. Ayadi won the César Award for Most Promising Actress for her role in the film; she shared the award with Clotilde Hesme, who won it for her role in Angel & Tony (2011).

Filmography

Feature films

Television

Director / Writer

Theater

Awards and nominations

César Award

References

External links

 Official site
 

Living people
French film actresses
French television actresses
Most Promising Actress César Award winners
French people of Tunisian descent
Year of birth missing (living people)
21st-century French actresses